San José (also called Villa San José) is a city in the center-east of the province of Entre Ríos, Argentina, located some 10 km northwest from Colón, near the Uruguay River.

References

 

Municipality of San José, Entre Ríos - Official website.

San José Web - News of San José, Entre Ríos, Argentina.

Populated places in Entre Ríos Province
Cities in Argentina
Argentina
Entre Ríos Province